Erin Clark (born 6 September 1997) is a Samoa international rugby league footballer who plays as a  for the Gold Coast Titans  in the NRL. 

Clark previously played for the New Zealand Warriors in the National Rugby League.

Background
Born in Auckland, New Zealand, Clark is of Māori and Samoan descent. Clark is the son of New Zealand netball great Temepara Bailey. and Wayne Clark.

Playing career
Clark played his junior football for the Manurewa Marlins and Point Chevalier Pirates, and attended Manurewa High School before being signed by the New Zealand Warriors. Clark represented the New Zealand Residents 18s and the New Zealand Secondary Schools in 2014. In 2014, Clark won the major rugby league accolade at the 2014 ASB Young Sportsperson of the Year Awards. In 2015, Clark was the only player in the Junior Warriors’ squad to appear in all 27 matches in the season.

On 7 May 2016, Clark played for Samoa against Tonga in the 2016 Polynesian Cup, where he played off the interchange bench in the 18-6 win at Parramatta Stadium. Later in the year he represented Samoa in a test match against Fiji in Apia, playing off the interchange bench in their 18-20 loss.
Clark made his first grade debut for the Warriors during the 2017 NRL season against Melbourne. He played for the Junior Kiwis on 5 May. On 9 June 2017, he was granted a release from the New Zealand Warriors and joined the Canberra Raiders.
On 24 November 2017, Clark requested a release from his Canberra contract and returned to New Zealand.
On 5 November 2019, Clark returned to rugby league, joining the Gold Coast on a train and trial deal.  On 10 January 2020, he signed a two-year deal with club.
Clark played 19 games for the Gold Coast in the 2021 NRL season including the club's elimination final loss against the Sydney Roosters.
Clark played a total of 21 games for the club in the 2022 NRL season as the Gold Coast finished 13th on the table.

References

External links
Gold Coast Titans profile
New Zealand Warriors profile

1997 births
Living people
Gold Coast Titans players
Junior Kiwis players
Manurewa Marlins players
New Zealand Māori rugby league players
New Zealand sportspeople of Samoan descent
New Zealand rugby league players
New Zealand Warriors players
Point Chevalier Pirates players
Rugby league five-eighths
Rugby league halfbacks
Rugby league hookers
Rugby league players from Auckland
Samoa national rugby league team players